Must is the seventh Korean studio album by South Korean boy band 2PM. The album was released on June 28, 2021. It is the first release by 2PM since all the members finished their military service.

Composition 
The album's lead track, "Make It", is a pop song with Jazz and Soul elements and was written and composed by member Wooyoung. The album's ten tracks borrowed elements from Jazz and Pop while maintaining 2PM's signature sweltering electronic sound. "Moon & Back" and "The Cafe", on the other hand, utilizes pulsating 808 drumming for a familiar R&B inflection. Other group members also participated in the production of the album.

Track listing

Charts

Weekly charts

Monthly charts

Year-end charts

References

2021 albums
2PM albums
JYP Entertainment albums
Korean-language albums